Berenice (275 BC–246 BC), also called Berenice Phernophorus ("Dowry Bearer") or Berenice Syra, was an Egyptian princess, and a Seleucid queen regent. She was a Seleucid queen by marriage to Antiochus II Theos, and regent during the minority of her son Antiochus in 246. 

She was the daughter of Ptolemy II Philadelphus and Arsinoe I of Egypt. 

Around 252 BC, following the peace agreement of 253 BC between Antiochus and Ptolemy to end the Second Syrian War, she married the Seleucid monarch Antiochus II Theos, who divorced his wife Laodice I and transferred the succession to Berenice's children.

In 246 BC, when Ptolemy died, Antiochus II took up again with his first wife, Laodice. Antiochus died shortly thereafter, many suspect from poisoning. Queen Berenice claimed the regency for her infant son Antiochus however, she and her son were both killed by Laodice. Berenice's brother, Ptolemy III Euergetes, succeeded their father and set about to avenge his sister's murder by invading Syria and having Laodice killed. This is also mentioned in the Book of Daniel .

Notes

References
"Women in power 500 - C.E. 1", accessed 20 March 2006

Ancient murder victims
Ptolemaic dynasty
Seleucid rulers
Seleucid royal consorts
3rd-century BC women rulers
270s BC births
246 BC deaths